The 2021 National People's Congress (NPC) was the Fourth Plenary Session of the 13th National People's Congress of the People's Republic of China (PRC). It was held from 5 March to 11 March 2021, concurrently with the Chinese People's Political Consultative Conference (CPPCC) as part of the annual Two Sessions. The NPC was held at the Great Hall of the People in Beijing.

Due to the ongoing COVID-19 pandemic, the Congress was mostly held in camera with journalists prohibited from attending. The thousands of deputies in attendance were all tested for SARS-CoV-2 and isolated before the event. Most of the events involving reporters took place through online conferencing.

Premier Li Keqiang announced a GDP growth goal of 6%, which was considered conservative compared to those of previous years, despite a goal from 2020 not being set due to the COVID-19 pandemic. Li also set targets for reducing the State Council's budget deficit from 3.6% of GDP in 2020 to around 3.2% of GDP in 2021 and announced plans to lower the quota on special bond issuance by local governments.

The NPC reviewed the Draft Fourteenth Five Year Plan.

References

National People's Congress, 2021
National People's Congress, 2021
National People's Congresses
National People's Congress, 2021